Lou Sansom (born 29 November 1946) is a former international speedway rider from Australia.

Speedway career 
Sansom was capped by Australia and rode in the top two tiers of British Speedway from 1970 to 1977, riding for various clubs. In 1973, he topped the league averages while riding for Workington Comets with a 10.56 average.

He helped run the training schools at the Aspatria Speedway during the early 1970s.

References 

Living people
1946 births
Australian speedway riders
Birmingham Brummies riders
Hull Vikings riders
Workington Comets riders